Vehicle extrication is the process of removing a vehicle from around a person who has been involved in a motor vehicle collision, when conventional means of exit are impossible or inadvisable. A delicate approach is needed to minimize injury to the victim during the extrication. This operation is usually accomplished by using chocks and bracing for stabilization and powered rescue tools and equipment, including the Jaws of Life. Standards and regulations for organizations can be found in NFPA 1670 and for individual members in 1006.

Operations 

The basic extrication procedure constitutes, but is not limited to, these six steps:
 the protection of the incident scene, to avoid a risk of another collision (marking out the scene with cones or flares (inadvisable if gasoline is leaking), lighting) and of fire (e.g. switching off the ignition, putting vehicle in park, disconnecting the battery, placing absorbing powder on oil and gasoline pools, fire extinguisher and fire hose ready to use); It is very common to use emergency vehicles as road blockers at crash scenes. 
 patient triage and initial medical assessment of the patient by a qualified medical rescuer;
 securing the vehicle (see cribbing), to prevent the unexpected movement (e.g. falling in a ditch), and the movements of the suspension, either of which could cause an unstable trauma wound or cause injury to the rescuers; a vehicle should never be moved, it should always be secured.
 the opening of the vehicle and the deformation of the structure (such as removing a window) to allow the intervention of a first responder, of a paramedic or of a physician inside the vehicle to better assess the patient and begin care and also to release a possible pressure on the casualty;
 removal of a section of the vehicle (usually the roof or door) to allow for safe removal of the victim, especially respecting the head-neck-back axis (rectitude of the spine);
 removal of the person from the vehicle

In less complicated cases, it is possible to extricate the casualty without actually cutting the vehicle, such as removing a person from the side door or another part of the vehicle. Extrication includes patient assessment, treatment, and removal of the patient from vehicle. Some departments only carry with them minimal tools such as one set of jaws of life and are only capable of simply "popping" a door off and then must step away to allow the medical rescuers in or to allow a more dedicated heavy rescue team in who has more equipment. Extrication units are supposed to not only have many different kinds of extrication tools, but medical equipment, oxygen, and backboards as well. Extrication is the entire process from fire protection, power unit disengagement, vehicle security, patient security and treatment, removal of vehicle from patient, removal of patient, and transfer to ambulance.

As soon as possible, best before beginning the mechanical operation, a medically trained person enters the cabin to perform first aid on the casualty: mid-level assessment, stopping the bleeding, putting a cervical collar on the patient (extrication operations are likely to provoke vibrations) although this practice is becoming less common, providing oxygen first aid. NFPA regulation 1006 and 1670 states that all "rescuers", whether they are part of an EMS department, fire department, or police department, must have a minimum of basic life support medical training to perform any technical rescue operation, since it is a comprehensive patient-centered process.

After the vehicle has been secured and access gained to the patient, the EMS team then enters to perform more detailed medical care. Continued protection of the patient from extrication itself, using hard and soft protection, should be done at all times. The deformation of the structure and the section of the roof take several minutes; this pre-extrication time can be used for medical or paramedical acts such as intubation or placing an intravenous drip. When the casualty is in cardiac arrest, cardiopulmonary resuscitation can be performed during the freeing, the casualty being seated. The use of this incompressible duration is sometimes called play and run, as a compromise between scoop and run (fast evacuation to a trauma center) and stay and play (maximum medical care onsite).

The last step is usually performed with a long spine board: the patient is pulled up on it. A Kendrick extrication device (KED) is sometimes used during this operation to try to help immobilize the spine and prevent further injury. 

Extrication, as defined by NFPA must be done by medically certified individuals, and as such, many technical rescue teams are run by Emergency Medical Services departments. In major cities, where fire departments handle emergency medical services, fire departments may provide technical rescue. In many rural areas, volunteer EMS agencies handle technical rescue. There are some departments that are a combination of Fire/EMS, Police/EMS or dedicated EMS, but the concept is that organizations that run technical rescue have some sort of EMS division or EMS training. Regardless, there should always be properly trained individuals performing these tasks, as it is defined by NFPA as a technical rescue.

Extrication tools and equipment
Rescue personnel use a number of powered rescue tools to extricate victims. There are three main types of powered rescue tools including:
 Hydraulic rescue tools – Rescue tools powered by a hydraulic pump. The pump may be powered by hand, an electric motor or a gasoline engine. They may be portable or mounted to a vehicle. There are 4 basic types of hydraulic rescue tools. They are extrication spreaders, extrication shears, combination extrication spreader/shears and extrication extension rams.
 Pneumatic rescue tools – Rescue tools that are powered by pressurized air. The pressurized air is sourced from SCBA cylinders, vehicle mounted cascade systems or vehicle mounted air compressors. Whizzer saws, Air bags, pneumatic rotary saws, air shores and air chisels are examples of pneumatically powered rescue tools.
Electric rescue tools – Rescue tools that are powered by electrical power. These tools have been used with vehicle extrication tools first through power cords linked to electricity generators and more recently through batteries. These can serve as both a primary set of tools or as a redundant system alongside gasoline-powered hydraulic tools. Reciprocating saws, spreaders, shears, extension rams, and spreader/shears can all be electrically powered.
 
The first step in an extrication is to size up the vehicle and to then stabilize the vehicle to prevent aggravating the injuries of the entrapped and to protect rescue workers. This is done by using stabilization tools including:
 Hydraulic and nonhydraulic jacks – Designed to lift the vehicle so cribbing can be placed. A vehicle must never be supported by only a jack and must be supported by cribbing. One inch of cribbing must be placed for every inch the jack lifts.
 Buttress Tension System – A buttress tension system is used to stabilize a vehicle resting on its side or top. It may consist of a minimum of three 4 x 4 inch posts wedged between the vehicle and the ground, or it may be a system composed of metal rods and straps. The exact placement varies by the condition and weight of the vehicle as well as what the vehicle is resting on.
 Wheel chock – Wheel chocks are used to stabilize vehicles resting on their wheels. They can support vehicles of a 10 to 15 percent grade. They are commonly constructed of aluminum, hard rubber, wood, or urethane plastic.
 Cribbing – Cribbing consist of wood or plastic blocks that are made in a variety of shapes and sizes.
 Pneumatic lifting bag – Pneumatic lifting bags are air-pressurized devices that lift objects. They come in three basic types: high-pressure, medium-pressure and low-pressure. They are usually made with a rubber exterior reinforced with steel wire or Kevlar. When deflated they are about one inch thick.
 Winches – Winches are mounted on vehicles and are usually faster, stronger and have a greater pulling distance than other pulling devices. They are used in conjunction with chains or cables.

Other equipment that can be used during a vehicle extrication include but are not limited to:

 Gasoline rotary saw – A well-maintained gasoline rotary saw is a must for fire ground and rescue operations. Choices include 12-, 14-, and 16-inch blade capabilities. Carbide toothed blades, abrasive blades, and diamond blades are among the common blade choices for saw uses.
 Reciprocating saw – This is a versatile tool that has made many uses in a rescue. Blades for reciprocating saws have undergone recent changes in composition. High-end carbide-tipped blades have had proven results in the fire service and can cut boron.
 Angle grinders – type 1 or a type 27 wheel are valuable in a metal scenario. Some of the above tools can be battery operated.
 Impact wrench/air ratchet – when paired with the right sockets, will speed up disassembly tasks. Air chisels are also ideal for rescue work. Depending on the tool size, capabilities may range from sheet metal to plate steel. Larger style air chisels are also effective on concrete.
 Oxy-fuel cutting torches  may be oxygen gasoline, oxygen, acetylene, or exothermic type torches. Space limitations on the rig often determine the size of the cylinders and, therefore, the torch capabilities.
 Tempered and laminated glass removal tools – Prior to completing disentanglement tactics, all applicable glass must be managed. Tools designed specifically for this application are more appropriate than traditional forcible-entry tools. They create less shock to the vehicle and limit patient compartment intrusion.
 Pliers, adjustable wrenches, screwdrivers, etc. – Tools such as these can be used to disconnect the 12-volt battery system; remove interior trim at all push, pull and cut locations; disassemble vehicle components, etc.
 Wire cutters and seatbelt cutters – Almost any disentanglement tactic requires wires and/or seatbelts to be severed for the complete removal of components. Having easy, quick tools readily available makes quick work of these tedious tasks.
 Razor knife – A sharp blade can be used to expose upholstered areas during operations. Examples may include the carpet during floorboard tactics, the headliner during roof tactics, and seat cushions during seat tactics.

Additional risks

Active systems such as airbags make cutting into a vehicle more complicated: when they are not set off during the crash (e.g. in a vehicle struck from the rear or a rollover), extrication operations may set them off. This can cause additional trauma to the victim or to the rescuers. Airbags can remain active anywhere from 5 seconds to 20 minutes after being disconnected from the car's battery. This is one of the reasons rescuers disconnect the vehicle's battery and wait before cutting into a vehicle.

Hood hinge struts can pose a great amount of danger to rescuers who are extricating a victim from a car that had any significant heat in the engine compartment. According to the strut manufacturers, these sealed and pressurized struts are designed to operate at temperatures ranging from 40 degrees Fahrenheit to 284 degrees Fahrenheit. No manufacturer could provide any evidence that any testing at temperatures above 284 degrees Fahrenheit had ever been conducted. During a vehicle fire, especially an engine compartment fire, the two hood hinge struts will be exposed to high heat levels. Since there is no pressure relief "valve" on any of these sealed and pressurized struts, the units can fail violently when overheated. Unfortunately for firefighters, this failure can actually "launch" the entire strut or just one part of the unit a significant distance off the vehicle like an unguided missile. It is the launching of the heated strut that in several incidents across the United States, has caused serious injury to firefighters.

New hybrid technologies also include additional high voltage batteries, or batteries located in unusual places. These can expose occupants and rescuers to shock, acid or fire hazards if not dealt with correctly. Some references to the actual nature of the Hazards : Honda Toyota Ford News Summary More.

Some vehicles have an additional autogas (LPG) tank. As the system was not built in, there is a risk of damaging the pipe which is often under the car, releasing the pressurized fuel. The risk of this is minimized by locating the line in a protected position during installation. Modern installations also have a shutoff solenoid at the tank so that rupture will only release the fuel in the line rather than allowing fuel to come out of the tank.

Car manufacturers are using ultra-high-strength steel (UHSS) to achieve the 5-star Government Crash Rating. Vehicles have UHSS areas of the body structure like the A-pillar, B-pillar, rockers, side impact beams, and roof beams. This steel is difficult to cut with the standard extrication tools.

See also

Hydraulic rescue tools
Traffic collision 
Heavy rescue vehicle
Rescue squad
Tram accident
Vehicle recovery
Firefighting

References

External links 
 Vehicle Extrication: Levels I & II: Principles And Practice [Paperback]
 Ron Moore's University of Extrication on Firehouse.com
  Extrication information on Vehicle Body Structures
  iRescue: App for iPhone/iPad to help the emergencie professionals to get information about a car in rescue situations 
Vehicle extraction technics (PDF file, 70p, 4.9 Mb)

Rescue
Automotive safety
Traffic collisions